The men's 100 metres at the 2011 European Athletics Junior Championships were held at the Kadrioru Stadium on 21 and 22 July.

Medalists

Records
Prior to the competition, the existing world junior and championship records were as follows.

Gold medalist Jimmy Vicaut established a new WJL with 10.07 sec in the final.

Schedule

Results

Heats
Qualification: First 2 in each heat (Q) and 2 best performers (q) advance to the Final.

Wind:Heat 1: −1.8 m/s, Heat 2: −0.5 m/s, Heat 3: −0.7 m/s

Final
Wind: +0.3 m/s

References

100 M